The 1927–28 Arkansas Razorbacks men's basketball team represented the University of Arkansas in the 1927–28 college basketball season. The Razorbacks played their home games in Schmidt Gymnasium in Fayetteville, Arkansas. It was Francis Schmidt's fifth season as head coach of the Hogs and the program's fifth season overall. The Razorbacks won the Southwest Conference regular season championship with a record of 12–0 and 19–1 overall, Arkansas's third of five straight conference titles and first-ever perfect conference season.

Future Arkansas football and basketball coach Glen Rose was a Helms First-Team All-American for the season. Tom Pickell, future head basketball coach Eugene Lambert, and College Football Hall of Fame member Wear Schoonover joined Rose on the All-SWC team.

Schedule and Results
Schedule retrieved from HogStats.com.

References

Arkansas Razorbacks
Arkansas Razorbacks men's basketball seasons